Guesdon is a surname, and may refer to:

 Alfred Guesdon (1808–1876), lithographer, architect
 André Guesdon (1948–2020), French football defender
 Frédéric Guesdon (born 1971), French cyclist